Peter Buljan (born 14 July 1978 in Canberra, Australia) is an Australian football player.

References

External links
OzFootball profile
Lost South Melbourne Interviews part 1 – Peter Buljan

1978 births
Living people
Sportspeople from Canberra
Soccer players from the Australian Capital Territory
Australian soccer players
Australian expatriate soccer players
National Soccer League (Australia) players
1. FC Saarbrücken players
Brisbane Strikers FC players
SV Eintracht Trier 05 players
Melbourne Knights FC players
South Melbourne FC players
Perth Glory FC players
2. Bundesliga players
Association football forwards